Ysgol Brynhyfryd is a bilingual co-educational comprehensive school in the town of Ruthin in Denbighshire, North Wales. The school serves the community of Ruthin and the many surrounding villages including the rural districts of Corwen, Carrog and Gwyddelwern. The bilingual ethos reflects the community it serves.

The school currently has 1221 pupils on roll, including 206 in the Sixth Form. Brynhyfryd is a naturally bilingual school which has; in years 7 and 8; two Welsh forms: H/Y and four English forms: B/R/F/D. The school is considered as a successful school with 68% of pupils leaving with at least five A*-C GCSE grades due to the last Estyn Inspection Report.

Ysgol Brynhyfryd was founded in 1898 under the name of "Ruthin County School for Girls". It became co-educational, as "Brynhyfryd School", in 1938, and formally became a comprehensive school, using the Welsh form of the name in the early 1970s.

32% of pupils come from Welsh-speaking homes, with 35% of pupils speaking Welsh as a first language or to an equivalent standard within the school.

Departments and main staff
Head: Mr Geraint Parry
Deputy Headteachers: Mrs Juliet Peters
Assistant Headteachers: Mrs Gwawr Jones & Mrs Ceri Ranson

Like most secondary schools in Wales, for KS3 and KS4 Ysgol Brynhyfryd offers a total of 13 subjects including Welsh (first and second language), English, Mathematics, Science, Technology, Information Communication Technology, History, Geography, RE, French, Art, Music, Modern Languages and PE.

It also features a theatre and arts complex, Theatre John Ambrose, named after a headmaster of the school in the 1980s and 1990s. This was opened by the actor Rhys Ifans, a former pupil of Ysgol Pentrecelyn and Ysgol Maes Garmon in Mold, but brought up in Ruthin.

Controversy
A former Biology teacher Matthew Jones had been reported to the school for years for inappropriate behaviour with little to no action being taken for years.

A footballer Corey Christopher Hycz often brought in to assist in PE. set up a fake Instagram account and blackmailed a schoolboy for indecent images while pretending to be a young girl. was later arrested and jailed for 27 months.

A Former Lab Technician at Brynhyfryd Michael Nicholls Married to a Physics teacher at the school was Jailed for 47 months after taking up skirt pictures and secretly recording and stalking a woman.

There have been many other incidents at the school over the years that the school has either dragged its heels over or done nothing at all about however they did not make referenceable articles.

Notable pupils 

 
 
 
 
 Joe Woolford – Welsh singer

References

External links
School website
2000 school results
Report to parents 2009.

Secondary schools in Denbighshire
Ruthin